is a Japanese mixed martial artist who competes in the featherweight division of Rizin Fighting Federation. A professional competitor since 2012, he has also competed for Road Fighting Championship, Fighting Network Rings and DEEP.

He is a former Fighting Network Rings 143-pound and 154-pound champion. Along with his mixed martial arts career, he is also a popular YouTuber in Japan.

He is the older brother of Kai Asakura.

Early life
Mikuru started his interest in martial arts training karate in elementary school, however he also played volleyball for three years.

Mikuru, along with his brother Kai Asakura, were involved in numerous street fights in their childhood, even fighting each other. As they got older, a therapist suggested to their mother to enrol them into boxing classes.

While studying at the Aichi Prefectural Toyohashi Technical High School, the Asakura brothers went to Zen Dokai Toyohashi Dojo, where they were first introduced to mixed martial arts.

Mixed martial arts career

Amateur career
Mikuru Asakura, as well as his brother Kai, fought their first amateur MMA fights under the Outsider brand of Fighting Network Rings. The Outsider brand was geared towards problematic youth, with focus on rehabilitating delinquents, criminals and gang members with MMA. He would later fight professionally with Outsider.

After winning his first amateur bout, against Kohei Shimada, with a first round rear-naked choke, Asakura put together a 6-1 record with 5 stoppages, only losing to Takehiro Higuchi.

Early career
Mikuru Asakura began his professional career in 2012 under the DEEP promotion, where he faced a fellow debutante Morikazu Itagaki. Asakura won the bout via TKO within 53 seconds. After a three-year hiatus, Mikuru returned to fight under the Outsider promotion, a spin off of the Fighting Network Rings promotion. He faced Keinosuke Yoshinaga, whom he defeated TKO in the first round to claim the Outsider 154 lbs Championship in just his 2nd professional bout at The Outsider 26.  Four months later in his very next bout at The Outsider 38, Asakura beat Takehiro Higuchi (the sole man to defeat him to that point) to claim the 143 lbs Championship. Asakura would defend his 143-lb title 9 months later at The Outsider 42 against Hiroyuki Furuta before competing in ROAD FC.. Under the banner off Road Fighting Championship at Road FC 37, Asakura fought Doo Seok Oh, who he beat by TKO in the first round.

Asakura would suffer his first career loss in a surprising unanimous decision to journeyman Kil Woo Lee during Road FC 43. However, he rebounded with a unanimous decision victory over Kosuke Terashima six months later at DEEP 83 Impact.

Rizin Fighting Federation
Mikuru Asakura made his Rizin debut on 12 August 2018, during Rizin 12. Asakura faced former Shooto featherweight champion and Japanese MMA legend, Hatsu Hioki. Mikuru won the fight in at 3:45 of the first round after knocking Hioki down with a head kick and following up with punches.

Asakura next faced Karshyga Dautbek at Rizin 13. Asakura employed an effective use of grappling and striking to outpoint the Kazakh fighter, and won a unanimous decision.

During Rizin: Heisei's Last Yarennoka!, Mikuru Asakura fought another former Shooto Featherweight Champion - this time being Takeshi Inoue. Asakura finished the bout with a well-timed knee that floored the former champion.

Mikuru Asakura's next fight was to be at Rizin 15 against Luiz Gustavo. He defeated Gustavo via unanimous decision.

At his next bout at Rizin 17 against fellow Rizin standout, Yusuke Yachi - in his first main event for RIZIN. Uniquely, this bout was prefaced with intensity and heated comments direct at one another, with both fighters saying that they couldn't stand one another. Yachi said that Asakura was afraid of him, while Mikuru told Yachi that he was not intelligent and that his YouTube content was 'crap'. Asakura scored a knockdown with seconds left in the bout en route to a unanimous decision victory.

After compiling a five-fight winning streak, Asakura was given a chance to represent Rizin against one of Bellator's fighters in the upcoming Rizin 20 event. In a match against former TUF Brazil Team Wanderlei contestant, John Macapa, Asakura won a unanimous decision to hand the veteran just his 5th loss of his 30-fight career.

At Rizin 21, Asakura faced TUF LA 2 Team Gastelum contestant, Daniel Salas as the main event. At 2:34 of the second round, Asakura landed a head kick and followed up with punches to end the contest.

After going 7-0 in the promotion and increasing in popularity, Rizin setup a title match for the inaugural Featherweight title between Asakura and reigning Shooto Featherweight Champion, Yutaka Saito at Rizin 25. Asakura lost via unanimous decision in his 3rd main event bout.

Despite having suffered his first loss, Asakura quickly turned around and fought at the annual NYE show at Rizin 26. He faced Satoshi Yamasu, and won by TKO in the first round, after landing his patented head kick, and following up with punches.

Mikuru faced Kleber Koike Erbst at Rizin 28. He lost the bout after being choked unconscious via triangle choke.

Mikuru faced Kyohei Hagiwara on October 10, 2021 at Rizin Landmark Vol.1. He won the bout via unanimous decision.

Asakura rematched Yutaka Saito at Rizin 33 - Saitama on December 31, 2021. He won the bout via unanimous decision.

Boxing

Asakura vs Mayweather
On June 13, 2022 Asakura announced he would be competing in a boxing exhibition bout against former world champion and boxing hall of famer, Floyd Mayweather. The fight would be at the Rizin event scheduled on September 25, 2022 at the Saitama Super Arena. Asakura lost the bout by 2nd round TKO.

Championships and achievements

Mixed martial arts
Fighting Network Rings
RINGS 65 kg Championship (One time)
RINGS 70 kg Championship (One time)

Mixed martial arts record
 

|-
|Win
|align=center| 16–3 (1)
|Yutaka Saito
|Decision (unanimous)
|Rizin 33
|
|align=center|3
|align=center|5:00
|Saitama, Japan
|
|-
|Win
|align=center| 15–3 (1)
|Kyohei Hagiwara	
|Decision (unanimous)
|Rizin Landmark Vol.1
|
|align=center|3
|align=center|5:00
|Tokyo, Japan
|
|-
|Loss
|align=center| 14–3 (1)
|Kleber Koike Erbst
|Technical Submission (triangle choke)
|Rizin 28
|
|align=center|2
|align=center|1:49
|Tokyo, Japan
|
|-
|Win
|align=center| 14–2 (1)
|Satoshi Yamasu
|KO (head kick and punch)
|Rizin 26
|
|align=center|1
|align=center|4:20
|Saitama, Japan
|
|-
|Loss
|align=center| 13–2 (1)
|Yutaka Saito
|Decision (unanimous)
|Rizin 25
|
|align=center|3
|align=center|5:00
|Osaka, Japan
|
|-
|Win
|align=center| 13–1 (1)
|Daniel Salas
|KO (head kick and punches)
|Rizin 21
|
|align=center|2
|align=center|2:34
|Hamamatsu, Japan
|
|-
|Win
|align=center| 12–1 (1)
|John Macapá
|Decision (unanimous)
|Rizin 20
|
|align=center|3
|align=center|5:00
|Saitama, Japan
|
|-
|Win
|align=center| 11–1 (1)
|Yusuke Yachi
|Decision (unanimous)
|Rizin 17
|
|align=center|3
|align=center|5:00
|Tokyo, Japan
|
|-
|Win
|align=center| 10–1 (1)
|Luiz Gustavo
|Decision (unanimous)
| Rizin 15
| 
| align=center|3
| align=center|5:00
| Yokohama, Japan
|
|-
|Win
|align=center| 9–1 (1)
|Takeshi Inoue
| TKO (flying knee and punches) 
| Rizin: Heisei's Last Yarennoka!
| 
| align=center|2
| align=center|2:39
| Tokyo, Japan
|
|-
|Win
|align=center| 8–1 (1)
|Karshyga Dautbek
|Decision (unanimous)
| Rizin 13
| 
| align=center|3
| align=center|5:00
| Saitama, Japan
|
|-
|Win
|align=center| 7–1 (1)
|Hatsu Hioki
| TKO (head kick and punches)
|Rizin 12
||
|align=center|1
|align=center|3:45
|Nagoya, Japan
|
|-
|Win
|align=center| 6–1 (1)
|Kosuke Terashima
|Decision (unanimous)
|DEEP 83 Impact
|
|align=center|2
|align=center|5:00
|Tokyo, Japan
|
|-
|Loss
|align=center| 5–1 (1)
|Kil Woo Lee
|Decision (unanimous)
|Road FC 43
| 
| align=center| 3
| align=center| 5:00
| Seoul, South Korea
| 
|-
|Win
|align=center| 5–0 (1)
|Doo Seok Oh
|TKO (punches)
|Road FC 37
|
|align=center|1
|align=center|4:06
|Seoul, South Korea
|
|-
|Win
|align=center| 4–0 (1)
|Hiroyuki Furuta
|TKO (punches)
|The Outsider 42
|
|align=center|1
|align=center|1:32
|Toyokawa, Japan
|
|-
|NC
|align=center| 3–0 (1)
|Ryo Asami
|NC (result overturned)
|The Outsider 39
|
|align=center|2
|align=center|2:12
|Tokyo, Japan
|
|-
|Win
|align=center| 3–0
|Takehiro Higuchi
|Submission (rear-naked choke)
|The Outsider 38
|
|align=center|1
|align=center|3:17
|Tokyo, Japan
|
|-
|Win
|align=center| 2–0
|Keinosuke Yoshinaga
|KO (punch)
|The Outsider 36
|
|align=center|1
|align=center|2:53
|Tokyo, Japan
|
|-
|Win
|align=center| 1–0
|Morikazu Itagaki
|KO (punch)
|DEEP Cage Impact 2012
|
|align=center|1
|align=center|0:53
|Hamamatsu, Japan
|
|-

|-
|Win
|align=center|1–0
|Hikaru Saito
|TKO (punches)
|E.P.W. Heroes
| 
|align=center|1
|align=center|0:25
|Matsuyama, Japan
|
|-

Amateur mixed martial arts record

|-
|Win
|align=center| 7–1
|Hiroki Takahashi
|KO (punch)
|The Outsider 34
|
|align=center|1
|align=center|0:23
|Tokyo, Japan
|
|-
|Win
|align=center| 6–1
|Kazunari Kimura
|TKO (punches)
|The Outsider 33
|
|align=center|1
|align=center|2:27
|Yokohama, Japan
|
|-
|Win
|align=center| 5–1
|Rikuto Shirakawa
|Decision (unanimous)
|The Outsider 30
|
|align=center|2
|align=center|3:00
|Tokyo, Japan
|
|-
|Win
|align=center| 4–1
|Jamal Morgan
|TKO (punches)
|The Outsider 29
|
|align=center|1
|align=center|1:57
|Tokyo, Japan
|
|-
|Loss
|align=center| 3–1
|Takehiro Higuchi
|Submission (ankle lock)
|The Outsider 28
|
|align=center|1
|align=center|1:06
|Kadoma, Japan
|
|-
|Win
|align=center| 3–0
|Musashi
|TKO (punches)
|The Outsider 26
|
|align=center|2
|align=center|0:21
|Yokohama, Japan
|
|-
|Win
|align=center| 2–0
|Ryuma Anno
|TKO (punches)
|The Outsider 25
|
|align=center|1
|align=center|2:35
|Tokyo, Japan
|
|-
|Win
|align=center| 1–0
|Kohei Shimada
|Submission (rear-naked choke)
|The Outsider 24
|
|align=center|1
|align=center|1:56
|Tokyo, Japan
|
|-
|}

Exhibition boxing record

See also
List of current Rizin FF fighters
List of male mixed martial artists

References

External links 
 

1993 births
Living people
People from Aichi Prefecture
Japanese male mixed martial artists
Mixed martial artists utilizing Kyokushin kaikan
Mixed martial artists utilizing boxing
Mixed martial artists utilizing Sumo
Mixed martial artists utilizing Brazilian jiu-jitsu
Japanese male karateka
Japanese practitioners of Brazilian jiu-jitsu
Japanese YouTubers